Calliostoma moebiusi is a species of sea snail, a marine gastropod mollusk in the family Calliostomatidae.

Description
The size of the shell varies between 9 mm and 17 mm.

Distribution
This marine species occurs off Argentina, Tierra del Fuego, Straits of Magellan and Chile at a depth of about 35 m.

References

 Strebel, H. 1905. Beiträge zur Kenntnis der Molluskenfauna der Magalhaen-Provinz. II. Die Trochiden. Zoologische Jahrbücher, Supplement 8: 121–166, pl. 5

External links
 To Encyclopedia of Life
 To World Register of Marine Species
 

moebiusi
Gastropods described in 1905